Donald McLeod (29 October 1892 – 22 August 1963) was an Australian politician. Born in Strathmerton, Victoria, he received a primary education and worked as a farmer before enlisting in the AIF in March 1916. He served as a Gunner in the 36 Australian Heavy Artillery Group until leaving the military in April 1919 to become a soldier settler at Gringegalgona. In 1940, he was elected to the Australian House of Representatives as the Labor member for Wannon. He held the seat until his defeat by Liberal candidate Dan Mackinnon in 1949. He defeated Mackinnon in a rematch two years later. In 1954, he was nearly defeated by Liberal challenger and future Prime Minister Malcolm Fraser, holding onto his seat by only 17 votes. After a redistribution made his seat notionally Liberal, McLeod retired in 1955 and returned to farming. He died in 1963.

References

External links

Australian Labor Party members of the Parliament of Australia
Members of the Australian House of Representatives for Wannon
Members of the Australian House of Representatives
1892 births
1963 deaths
20th-century Australian politicians